The Revolutionary Association was a Polish 18th century underground society, founded in Warsaw. Created at the outbreak of the Kościuszko's Uprising by the envoy of Tadeusz Kościuszko, Tomasz Maruszewski, it united a number of officers of the Warsaw Garrison, incl. Michał Chomentowski and Grzegorz Ropp. Its sole aim was to prepare the Warsaw Uprising (1794).

Kościuszko Uprising